Stoa USA, also referred to as Stoa, is a Christian homeschool forensics organization in the United States. It is one of the four major national high school forensics organizations: the others are the National Speech and Debate Association (NSDA), National Catholic Forensic League (NCFL), and the National Christian Forensics and Communications Association (NCFCA).

Stoa is defined by the Merriam-Webster Dictionary as “an ancient Greek portico usually walled at the back with a front colonnade designed to afford a sheltered promenade.” The Stoa was a common fixture of many towns in Ancient Greece and was used as a place where people could debate and discuss their ideas.

Overview

Stoa was created in 2009 to  serve the needs of the growing homeschool speech and debate community. Its website explains that its objective is “to train Christian home schooled youth in speech and debate in order to better communicate a Biblical worldview.”

Stoa USA is a non-profit organization run entirely by volunteers. It is governed by a board of directors who oversee its day-to-day operations and propose rule amendments which affect competitors nationwide. Members vote on important issues, such as debate resolutions and significant rule changes. Judges are usually parents, coaches, alumni, or members of the community.

Stoa sanctions only one tournament each year, the National Invitational Tournament of Champions (NITOC) (referenced below).
Stoa exists to support state and local organizations in running tournaments, but recognizes the autonomy of those at the state and local level to operate in a manner that best serves their particular needs. Some locally-run tournaments attract hundreds of Stoa competitors each year, such as the one typically held in the spring at Concordia University in Irvine, CA. The best Stoa competitor is widely considered to be Luis Garcia, who won first place in the Apologetics category at every tournament he attended, including the Concordia Challenge and NITOC.

Because homeschooled students are not typically associated with schools, most affiliates belong to member “Clubs.” Most club members live in the local area around where their club is based.

Speechranks and the Point Recognition System
The National Christian Homeschool Speech and Debate Rankings, also known as Speechranks, is a comprehensive website that ranks Christian homeschooled speakers and debaters around the country who are in high school or middle school. Speechranks was created in 2010 for promoting transparency and fairness in the Christian homeschool forensics community.
Results from Stoa tournaments are uploaded onto Speechranks by tournament administrators. Speechranks also allows students to enter their own information if they compete in other Christian homeschool tournaments. The website is monitored to ensure the integrity of the information entered. Viewers may also “Flag” results they believe to be in error. 
According to its website, there were 1,946 active competitors on Speechranks during the 2016–2017 season.

There are two ways that Speechranks measures student participation: Points and Green Check Marks. Points are awarded to competitors based on the student's percentile finish in each event. Students achieving the same percentile finish in any event and any tournament will be awarded the same number of Points. A student's three best finishes in a particular event are used to sum their total Points for that event. Overall ranking on Speechranks is determined by the total number of Points a competitor has accumulated. Green Check Marks recognize consistent excellence throughout the competitive season. There is no limit to the number of Green Check Marks a student may earn. In general, Green Check Marks are awarded to any competitor who achieves a winning record in debate or finishes in the top 40% of an individual event (IE). Green Check Marks are unique to each event and students may not transfer checkmarks from one event to another.
 
Speechranks requirements were drafted by Isaiah McPeak, with development chaired by Dr. Van Schalin and programmed by Connor McKay. It utilizes the Ruby Programming Language, the same language Stoa uses for membership and tournament registration.

National Invitational Tournament of Champions [NITOC]
Each year in late May or early June, the Stoa Board of Directors hosts the National Invitational Tournament of Champions, commonly referred to as NITOC.
There are two methods in which competitors may earn an invitation to NITOC. The first method, entitled the “National Invitational Model,” involves being awarded at least two Green Check Marks on Speechranks in one or more events.
In the second method, known as the “State Invitational Model,” the top speaker of each state in each individual event qualifies for an invitation, as well as the top two teams in Lincoln Douglas Debate and Team Policy Debate.
Participation at NITOC requires Stoa membership. Students may compete in as many events at NITOC in which they are invited by either of the two invitational models. The 2012 National Invitational Tournament of Champions, held in Colorado Springs, Colorado, was regarded as the largest tournament in the history of homeschool speech and debate, where nearly 600 students competed across 13 different events.

Locations
 2022: Dallas Baptist University, Dallas, Texas
 2021: Union University, Jackson, Tennessee (Originally intended to be held at Point Loma Nazarene University, San Diego, California, but was relocated to Union University due to uncertainty about the state of California's intense COVID-19 lockdowns)
2020: Union University, Jackson, Tennessee (Canceled due to COVID-19)
 2019: Dallas Baptist University, Dallas, Texas
 2018: Point Loma Nazarene University, San Diego, California
 2017: Union University, Jackson, Tennessee
 2016: Drury University, Springfield, Missouri
 2015: Bob Jones University, Greenville, South Carolina
 2014: California State University, San Marcos, California - Due to a wildfire that broke out near the university and the school's subsequent evacuation, this tournament was held in multiple locations across San Diego County including Point Loma Nazarene University and San Diego State University.
 2013:  John Brown University, Siloam Springs, Arkansas
 2012: Focus on the Family Headquarters, Colorado Springs, Colorado
 2011: Point Loma Nazarene University, San Diego, California
 2010: University of San Diego, San Diego, California

Events

Debate
Lincoln Douglas Value Debate

Team Policy Debate

American Parliamentary Debate

Speech

Limited Preparation 
Apologetics. "In Apologetics, the competitor is given four (4) minutes to prepare a persuasive and reasoned six (6) minute speech that defends a tenet of the Christian faith and explains why that principle matters."

Extemporaneous. "In Extemporaneous speaking, the competitor answers a given question based on recent events in the news. The competitor researches national and international current events and may create reference files of newsworthy information. Extemporaneous speech should be regarded as a demonstration of personal knowledge on the topic, as well as an original synthesis of numerous sources."

Mars Hill Impromptu. "In Mars Hill Impromptu, the competitor uses books, movies, and other genre to discuss the appeal and impact of the theme(s) within the topic, holding them up in light of Christian truth found in the Bible. This event is intended for competitors 14 and older or with the consent of the parents due to mature themes in some topics."

Impromptu. In 2015 STOA removed Impromptu as a national qualifying event, though some states and tournaments continued to coach and allow impromptu competition. In 2022 it again became a NITOC event. The competitor receives three different topics and must choose one topic to speak about during a two (2) minute prep time. When the prep time expires, the competitor is given a speaking time limit of five (5) minutes.

Platform 
Expository. "An Expository is a prepared speech written by the competitor which explains and illustrates a topic through both words and visuals (e.g. illustrated boards, physical props, digital and electronic presentations, or any combination)."

Original Oratory. "An Original Oratory is a prepared speech, written by the competitor, on a topic of the competitor’s choice. The purpose of this informative speech is to explain, describe, or expose the topic."

Persuasive. "A persuasive speech is a prepared speech, written by the competitor, which advocates a specific position or course of action."

Interpretive 
Open Interpretation.

Duo Interpretation

Humorous Interpretation

Dramatic Interpretation

Wildcard 
2022-2023 Interp in a Box

2021-2022: Oratory Analysis

2020-2021: Oratory Analysis

2019-2020: Oratory Analysis

2018-2019: Demonstration

2017-2018: Cold Reading, Demonstration

2016-2017: Monologue, Cold Reading

2015-2016: Motivational, Monologue

2014-2015: Broadcasting, Motivational

2013-2014: Storytelling, Broadcasting

2012-2013: Mars Hill Impromptu, Storytelling

2011-2012: Original Interpretation

Debate Resolutions

2023-2024

The possible resolutions for the 2023-2024 debate season are:

Team Policy: 

1. Resolved: The United States Federal Government should substantially reform its energy policy.

2. Resolved: The United States Federal Government should substantially reform its policy on consumer protection or anti-trust.

3. Resolved: That the United States Federal Government should substantially reform its revenue generation policies.

Lincoln-Douglas: 

1. Resolved: The letter of the law ought to have priority over the spirit of the law.

2. Resolved: National security concerns ought to be valued above individual rights.

3. Resolved: Higher Education is overvalued in the United States.

4. Resolved: A free press ought to prioritize objectivity over advocacy.

5. Resolved: Elected representatives ought to value constituent interests above their own conscience.

2022-2023
Team Policy: Resolved: The United States Federal Government should substantially reform its policy towards one or more countries in Europe.

Lincoln-Douglas: Resolved: Criminal justice ought to prioritize rehabilitation over retribution, restitution or deterrence.

2021-2022
Team Policy: Resolved: The United States Federal Government should substantially reform the use of Artificial Intelligence technology.

Lincoln-Douglas: Resolved: In the field of biomedical engineering, restraint ought to be prioritized over scientific advancement.

2020-2021
Team Policy: Resolved: The United States Federal Government should considerably decrease its military commitments.

Lincoln-Douglas: Resolved: Economic stability is more important than economic growth.

2019-2020
Team Policy: Resolved: The United States federal government should substantially reform its banking, finance, and/or monetary policy.

Lincoln-Douglas: Resolved: Culture ought to value assimilation over multiculturalism.

2018-2019
Team Policy: Resolved: The United States federal government should substantially reform its foreign aid.

Lincoln-Douglas: Resolved: In criminal procedure, truth-seeking ought to be valued above individual privacy.

2017-2018 
Team Policy: Resolved: The United States federal government should substantially reform its transportation policy.

Lincoln-Douglas: Resolved: Preemptive warfare is morally justified.

2016-2017 
Team Policy: Resolved: The United States federal government should substantially reform its agriculture and/or food safety policy in the United States.

Lincoln-Douglas: Resolved: The needs of the public ought to be valued above private property rights.

2015-2016 
Team Policy: Resolved: The United States federal government should substantially reform its trade policy with one or more of the following nations: China, Japan, South Korea, Taiwan.

Lincoln-Douglas: Resolved: In formal education liberal arts ought to be valued above practical skills. (from October 1, 2015, to January 30, 2016)

Resolved: Developing countries ought to prioritize economic growth over environmental protection. (from February 1, 2016, to April 30, 2016)

2014-2015 
Team Policy: Resolved: The United States federal government should substantially reform its electronic surveillance law.

Lincoln-Douglas: Resolved: When in conflict, an individual's freedom of speech should be valued above a community's moral standards. (from October 1, 2014, to January 30, 2015)

Resolved: The United States federal jurisprudence, the letter of the law ought to have priority over the spirit of the law. (from February 1, 2015, to April 30, 2015)

2013-2014 
Team Policy: Resolved: The United States federal government should substantially reform its marine natural resource policies.

Lincoln-Douglas: Resolved: The United States has a moral obligation to mitigate international conflicts

2012-2013 
Team Policy: Resolved: The United States federal government should substantially reform its foreign military presence and/or foreign military commitments.

Lincoln-Douglas: Resolved: Privacy is undervalued.

2011-2012 
Team Policy: Resolved: That the United States federal government should substantially reform its revenue generation policies.

Lincoln-Douglas: Resolved: When in conflict, personal freedom ought to be valued above economic security.

2010-2011 
Team Policy: Resolved: That the United States Federal Government should significantly reform its policy toward Russia.

Lincoln-Douglas: Resolved: A government's legitimacy is determined more by its respect for popular sovereignty than individual rights.

2009-2010 
Team Policy: Resolved: That the United States Federal Government should significantly reform its environmental policy.

Lincoln-Douglas: Resolved: That competition is superior to cooperation as a means of achieving excellence.

See also
National Christian Forensics and Communications Association
National Forensic League
 
National Catholic Forensic League

References

External links
Stoa USA
Speechranks

Student debating societies
Homeschooling in the United States